Daphne Margaret du Grivel Oxenford (31 October 1919 – 21 December 2012) was an English actress, known for her early stage roles, and later her radio and television work. She was the voice ("Are you sitting comfortably ...?") of BBC radio's Listen with Mother from its inception in 1950 to 1971. As spinster Esther Hayes, she was part of the original cast of Coronation Street. Other notable roles include Mrs Plummer in Man About the House (1973), Alice Dutton in EastEnders (1990), and Mrs. Oldknow in the mini-series The Children of Green Knowe (1986).

Early life and early career
Born in Barnet, Hertfordshire, to chartered accountant Dudley Oxenford and his wife Marie (née du Grivel), a writer of historical fiction, Oxenford first appeared on stage at the age of thirteen and trained at the Embassy School of Acting in Swiss Cottage, North London. She was briefly employed by a bank before working in censorship during World War II while performing in revues in her spare time. At the end of the war she toured with ENSA before returning to revues in London.

After her marriage she moved to Manchester and appeared regularly at the Library Theatre and the Royal Exchange Theatre as well as in the West End. In 1947 she successfully auditioned for Joyce Grenfell, who became a close friend and godmother to Oxenford's daughter.

Radio and television
Among her most high-profile roles was the voice – "Are you sitting comfortably ...?" – for BBC radio's Listen with Mother from 1950 to 1971; she was also a reader on the newspaper review programme What the Papers Say for over thirty years. One of the original cast members of Coronation Street, she played Esther Hayes from 1960 to 1963, 1971 and 1972. She played Mrs. Patterson, the owner of the village shop, in the popular sitcom To the Manor Born. In the seventies and early eighties she was part of Listen to Les The Les Dawson Radio Show on BBC Radio 2, and performed in The Clitheroe Kid radio comedy series from time to time. She played Chrissy's mother in three episodes of Man About the House- Series 4 - Episode 5 (1973–76).

Other TV credits include: The Sweeney, The Duchess of Duke Street, Juliet Bravo, The Children of Green Knowe and Hetty Wainthropp Investigates. She appeared in the 1987 Doctor Who serial Dragonfire. She filmed a scene as an elderly Agatha Christie for the 2008 episode The Unicorn and the Wasp, but was cut from the final broadcast version, though it later featured on the DVD release. In 2006, she guest-starred in the audio drama Sapphire and Steel: Cruel Immortality. She appeared in three episodes of Midsomer Murders (2004–2008) as Muriel, Cully's grandmother. Her film credits include That'll Be the Day (1973), All Creatures Great and Small (1975) and Sweet William (1980). Her voice was used for a Listen With Mother programme in 1977 for the sitcom Rising Damp.

Personal life
Oxenford was married to David Marshall from 1951 until his death in February 2003. They had two daughters.

References

External links
 

1919 births
2012 deaths
English radio actresses
English soap opera actresses
English television actresses
20th-century British businesspeople